Taiwan Semiconductor Manufacturing Company Limited (TSMC; also called Taiwan Semiconductor) is a Taiwanese multinational semiconductor contract manufacturing and design company. It is the world's most valuable semiconductor company, the world's largest dedicated independent (pure-play) semiconductor foundry, and one of Taiwan's largest companies, with its headquarters and main operations located in the Hsinchu Science Park in Hsinchu. It is majority owned by foreign investors.

Founded in Taiwan in 1987 by Morris Chang, TSMC was the world's first dedicated semiconductor foundry and has long been the leading company in its field. When Chang retired in 2018, after 31 years of TSMC leadership, Mark Liu became chairman and C. C. Wei became Chief Executive. It has been listed on the Taiwan Stock Exchange (TWSE: 2330) since 1993; in 1997 it became the first Taiwanese company to be listed on the New York Stock Exchange (NYSE: TSM). Since 1994, TSMC has had a compound annual growth rate (CAGR) of 17.4% in revenue and a CAGR of 16.1% in earnings.

Most of the leading fabless semiconductor companies such as AMD, Apple, ARM, Broadcom, Marvell, MediaTek, Qualcomm and Nvidia, are customers of TSMC, as are emerging companies such as Allwinner Technology, HiSilicon, Spectra7, and UNISOC. Leading programmable logic device companies Xilinx and previously Altera also make or made use of TSMC's foundry services.
Some integrated device manufacturers that have their own fabrication facilities, such as Intel, NXP, STMicroelectronics and Texas Instruments, outsource some of their production to TSMC. At least one semiconductor company, LSI, re-sells TSMC wafers through its ASIC design services and design IP portfolio.

TSMC has a global capacity of about thirteen million 300 mm-equivalent wafers per year as of 2020 and makes chips for customers with process nodes from 2 microns to 5 nanometres. TSMC was the first foundry to market 7-nanometre and 5-nanometre (used by the 2020 Apple A14 and M1 SoCs and the MediaTek Dimensity 8100) production capabilities, and the first to commercialize extreme ultraviolet (EUV) lithography technology in high volume.

History 
In 1986, Mr. Li Kwoh-ting, representing the Executive Yuan, invited Morris Chang to serve as the president of the ITRI. At that time, Taiwan government wanted to develop the semiconductor industry, but the investment amount was too large and the risk was too high, so no one was willing to invest. In this predicament, only Philips was willing to sign a joint venture contract with Taiwan to invest 27.5% of TSMC's capital.

The company has been increasing and upgrading its manufacturing capacity for most of its existence, although influenced by the demand cycles of the semiconductor industry. In 2011, the company planned to increase research and development expenditures by almost 39% to NT$50 billion to fend off growing competition. The company also planned to expand capacity by 30% in 2011 to meet strong market demand. In May 2014, TSMC's board of directors approved capital appropriations of US$568 million to establish, convert, and upgrade advanced technology capacity after the company forecast higher than expected demand. In August 2014, TSMC's board of directors approved additional capital appropriations of US$3.05 billion.

In 2011, it was reported that TSMC had begun trial production of the A5 SoC and A6 SoCs for Apple's iPad and iPhone devices. According to reports, as of May 2014, Apple is sourcing its new A8 and A8X SoCs from TSMC and later sourced the A9 SoC with both TSMC and Samsung (to increase volume for iPhone 6S launch) with the A9X being exclusively made by TSMC, thus resolving the issue of sourcing a chip in two different microarchitecture sizes. Apple has become TSMC's most important customer.

In October 2014, ARM and TSMC announced a new multi-year agreement for the development of ARM based 10 nm FinFET processors.

In 2020, TSMC became the first semiconductor company in the world to sign up for RE100, pledging to use 100% renewable energy by 2050. TSMC accounts for roughly 5% of the energy consumption in Taiwan, exceeding that of the capital city Taipei. This initiative was thus expected to accelerate the transformation to renewable energy in the country.

TSMC results for 2020 were
net income of US$17.60 billion on consolidated revenue of US$45.51 billion, which increased 57.5 percent and
31.4 percent respectively from the 2019 level of US$11.18 billion net income and US$34.63 billion consolidated revenue.
Its market capitalization was over $550 billion in April 2021.

TSMC's revenue in the first quarter of 2020 reached US$10 billion, while its market capitalization was US$254 billion. TSMC's market capitalization reached a value of NT$1.9 trillion (US$63.4 billion) in December 2010. It was ranked 70th in the FT Global 500 2013 list of the world's most highly valued companies with a capitalization of US$86.7 billion, while reaching US$110 billion in May 2014. In March 2017, TSMC's market capitalization surpassed that of semiconductor giant Intel for the first time, hitting NT$5.14 trillion (US$168.4 billion), with Intel's at US$165.7 billion. On June 27, 2020, TSMC briefly became the world's 10th most valuable company, with a market capitalization of US$410 billion.

In July 2020, TSMC confirmed it would halt the shipment of silicon wafers to Chinese telecommunications equipment manufacturer Huawei and its subsidiary HiSilicon by 14 September.

As the risk of a war between Taiwan and the People's Republic of China increases, TSMC and its investors have explored options to mitigate the consequences of such an event. Since the beginning of the 2020s, TSMC has expanded its operations outside of the island of Taiwan, opening new fabs in Japan and the United States, with further plans for expansion into Germany.

In November 2020, officials in Phoenix, Arizona in the United States approved TSMC's plan to build a $12 billion chip plant in the city. The decision to locate a plant in the US came after the Trump administration warned about the issues concerning the world's electronics made outside of the U.S. In 2021, news reports claimed that the facility might be tripled to roughly a $35 billion investment with six factories.

Following nearly a year of public controversy surrounding its COVID-19 vaccine shortage, with only about 10% of its 23.5 million population vaccinated; in June 2021, Taiwan agreed to allow TSMC and Foxconn to jointly negotiate purchasing COVID-19 vaccines on its behalf. In July 2021, BioNTech's Chinese sales agent Fosun Pharma announced that the two technology manufacturers had reached an agreement to purchase 10 million BioNTech COVID-19 vaccines from Germany for Taiwan. TSMC and Foxconn pledged to each buy five million doses for up to $175 million, for donation to Taiwan's vaccination program.

Due to the 2020–2022 global semiconductor shortage, United Microelectronics raised prices approximately 7–9 percent, and prices for TSMC's more mature processors will be raised by about 20 percent.

In November 2021, TSMC and Sony announced that TSMC would be establishing a new subsidiary named  (JASM) in Kumamoto, Japan. The new subsidiary will manufacture 22 and 28-nanometer processes. The initial investment will be approximately $7 billion, with Sony investing approximately $500 million for a less than 20% stake. Construction of the fabrication plant is expected to start in 2022, with production targeted to begin two years later in 2024.

In February 2022, TSMC, Sony Semiconductor Solutions, and Denso announced that Denso would take a more than 10% equity stake in  JASM with a US$0.35 billion investment, amid a scarcity of chips for automobiles.  TSMC will also enhance JASM’s capabilities with 12/16 nanometer FinFET process technology in addition to the previously announced 22/28 nanometer process and increase monthly production capacity from 45,000 to 55,000 12-inch wafers. The total capital expenditure for JASM’s Kumamoto fab is estimated to be approximately US$8.6 billion. The Japanese government wants JASM to supply essential chips to Japan's electronic device makers and auto companies as trade friction between the United States and China threatens to disrupt supply chains. The fab is expected to directly create about 1,700 high-tech professional jobs.

In July 2022, TSMC announced the company had posted a record profit in the second quarter, with net income up 76.4 percent year-over-year. The company saw steady growth in the automotive and data center sectors with some weakness in the consumer market. Some of the capital expenditures are projected to be pushed up to 2023.

In the third quarter of 2022, Berkshire Hathaway disclosed purchase of 60 million shares in TSMC, acquiring a $4.1 billion stake, making it one of its largest holdings in a technology company. However, Berkshire sold off 86.2% of its stake by the next quarter.

In December 2022, TSMC announced its plans to triple its investment in the Arizona plants in response to the growing tensions between the US and China and the supply chain disruption that has led to chip shortages. In that same month, TSMC stated that they were running into major cost issues, because the cost of construction of buildings and facilities in the US is four to five times what an identical plant would cost in Taiwan, (due to higher costs of labor, red tape, and training), as well as difficulty finding qualified personnel (for which it has hired US workers and sent them for training in Taiwan for 12-18 months.)  These additional production costs will increase the cost of TSMC's chips made in the US to at least 50% more than the cost of chips made in Taiwan.

However, concerns have also been raised regarding a conflict of interest in defense policy which could provide US senators and lawmakers with an incentive for a military escalation between the two countries.

Patent dispute with GlobalFoundries 
On 26 August 2019, GlobalFoundries filed several patent infringement lawsuits against TSMC in the US and Germany claiming that TSMC's 7 nm, 10 nm, 12 nm, 16 nm, and 28 nm nodes infringed 16 of their patents. GlobalFoundries named twenty defendants. TSMC said that they  were confident that the allegations were baseless.

On 1 October 2019, TSMC filed patent infringement lawsuits against GlobalFoundries in the US, Germany and Singapore, claiming that GlobalFoundries' 12 nm, 14 nm, 22 nm, 28 nm and 40 nm nodes infringed 25 of their patents.

On 29 October 2019, TSMC and GlobalFoundries announced a resolution to the dispute, agreeing to a life-of-patents cross-license for all of their existing semiconductor patents and new patents for the next 10 years.

Sales and market trends 

TSMC and the rest of the foundry industry are exposed to the cyclical industrial dynamics of the semiconductor industry. TSMC must ensure its production capacity to meet strong customer demand during upturns. However, during downturns, it must contend with excess capacity because of weak demand and the high fixed costs associated with its manufacturing facilities. As a result, the company's financial results tend to fluctuate with a cycle time of a few years. This is more apparent in earnings than revenues because of the general trend of revenue and capacity growth. TSMC's business has generally also been seasonal, with a peak in Q3 and a low in Q1.

In 2014, TSMC was at the forefront of the foundry industry for high-performance, low-power applications, leading major smartphone chip companies such as Qualcomm, Mediatek and Apple to place an increasing amount of orders. While the competitors in the foundry industry (primarily GlobalFoundries and United Microelectronics Corporation) have encountered difficulties ramping leading-edge 28 nm capacity, the leading Integrated Device Manufacturers such as Samsung and Intel that seek to offer foundry capacity to third parties were also unable to match the requirements for advanced mobile applications.

For most of 2014, TSMC saw a continuing increase in revenues due to increased demand, primarily due to chips for smartphone applications. TSMC raised its financial guidance in March 2014 and posted ‘unseasonably strong’ first-quarter results. For Q2 2014, revenues came in at NT$183 billion, with 28 nm technology business growing more than 30% from the previous quarter. Lead times for chip orders at TSMC increased due to a tight capacity situation, putting fabless chip companies at risk of not meeting their sales expectations or shipment schedules, and in August 2014 it was reported that TSMC's production capacity for the fourth quarter of 2014 was already almost fully booked, a scenario that had not occurred for many years, which was described as being due to a ripple-effect due to TSMC landing CPU orders from Apple.

However, monthly sales for 2014 peaked in October, decreasing by 10% in November due to cautious inventory adjustment actions taken by some of its customers. TSMC's revenue for 2014 saw growth of 28% over the previous year, while TSMC forecasted that revenue for 2015 would grow by 15 to 20 percent from 2014, thanks to strong demand for its 20 nm process, new 16 nm FinFET process technology as well as continuing demand for 28 nm, and demand for less advanced chip fabrication in its 200mm fabs.

Technologies 

TSMC's N7+ is the first commercially available extreme-ultraviolet lithographic process in the semiconductor industry. It uses ultraviolet patterning and enables more acute circuits to be implemented on the silicon. N7+ offers a 15-20% higher transistor density and 10% reduction in power consumption than previous technology. The N7 achieved the fastest ever volume time to market, faster than 10 nm and 16 nm.

The N5 iteration doubles transistor density and improves performance by an additional 15%.

Production capabilities 
On 300 mm wafers, TSMC has silicon lithography on node sizes:
 0.13 μm (options: general-purpose (G), low-power (LP), high-performance low-voltage (LV)).
 90 nm (based upon 80GC from Q4/2006),
 65 nm (options: general-purpose (GP), low-power (LP), ultra-low power (ULP), LPG).
 55 nm (options: general-purpose (GP), low-power (LP)).
 40 nm (options: general-purpose (GP), low-power (LP), ultra-low power (ULP)).
 28 nm (options: high-performance (HP), high-performance mobile (HPM), high-performance computing (HPC), high-performance low-power (HPL), low-power (LP), high-performance computing Plus (HPC+), ultra-low power (ULP)) with HKMG.
 22 nm (options: ultra-low power (ULP), ultra-low leakage (ULL))
 20 nm
 16 nm (options: FinFET (FF), FinFET Plus (FF+), FinFET Compact (FFC))
 12 nm (options: FinFET Compact (FFC), FinFET NVIDIA (FFN)), enhanced version of 16 nm process.
 10 nm (options: FinFET (FF))
 7 nm (options: FinFET (FF), FinFET Plus (FF+), FinFET Pro (FFP), high-performance computing (HPC))
 6 nm (options: FinFET (FF)), risk production starting in Q1 2020, enhanced version of 7 nm process.
 5 nm (options: FinFET (FF)).
 4 nm (options: FinFET (FF)). risk production starting in 2021, enhanced version of 5 nm process.

It also offers "design for manufacturing" (DFM) customer services.

In press publications, these processes will often be referenced, for example, for the mobile variant, simply by 7nmFinFET or even more briefly by 7FF.

TSMC is at the beginning of 2019 advertising N7+, N7, and N6 as its leading edge technologies, and announced its intention of adding a 3 nanometer (3 nm) semiconductor node into commercial production for 2022. TSMC's 3 nm process will still use FinFET (fin field-effect transistor) technology.

As of June 2020, TSMC is the manufacturer selected for production of Apple's 5 nanometer ARM processors, as "the company plans to eventually transition the entire Mac lineup to its Arm-based processors, including the priciest desktop computers".

In July 2020, TSMC signed a 20-year deal with Ørsted to buy the entire production of two offshore wind farms under development off Taiwan's west coast. At the time of its signing, it was the world's largest corporate green energy order ever made.

In July 2021, both Apple and Intel were reported to be testing their proprietary chip designs with TSMC's 3 nm production.

Facilities 

Apart from its main base of operations in Hsinchu in Northern Taiwan, where several of its fab facilities are located, it also has leading-edge fabs in Southern Taiwan and Central Taiwan, with other fabs located at its subsidiaries TSMC China in Shanghai, China, WaferTech in Washington state, United States, and SSMC in Singapore, and it has offices in China, Europe, India, Japan, North America, and South Korea.

The following fabs were in operation in 2020:
 Four 300 mm "GIGAFABs" in operation in Taiwan: Fab 12 (Hsinchu), 14 (Tainan), 15 (Taichung), 18 (Tainan)
 Four 200 mm wafer fabs in full operation in Taiwan: Fab 3, 5, 8 (Hsinchu), 6 (Tainan)
 TSMC China Company Limited, 200 mm: Fab 10 (Shanghai)
 TSMC Nanjing Company Limited, 300 mm: Fab 16 (Nanjing)
 WaferTech L.L.C., TSMC's wholly owned US subsidiary, a 200 mm fab: Fab 11 (Camas, Washington)
 SSMC (Systems on Silicon Manufacturing Co.), a joint venture with NXP Semiconductors in Singapore, 200 mm, where production started at the end of 2002
 One 150 mm wafer fab in full operation in Taiwan: Fab 2 (Hsinchu)

Fab partially online as of 2021:
 Fab 18, 300 mm (Tainan), phase 3 and 4

Fab planned as of 2021:
 Arizona, USA (under construction November 2021, anticipated to use 5 nm process)
 Kumamoto, Japan (planned groundbreaking in 2021, anticipated to use 22 nm and 28 nm process)

TSMC has four Backend Fabs under operation: Fab 1 (Hsinchu), 2 (Tainan), 3 (Taoyuan City), and 5 (Taichung)

In 2020, TSMC announced a planned fab in Phoenix, Arizona, the US, intended to begin production by 2024 at a rate of 20,000 wafers per month. As of 2020, TSMC announced that it would bring its newest 5 nm process to the Arizona facility, a significant break from its prior practice of limiting US fabs to older technologies. However, the Arizona plant will not be fully operational until 2024, when the 5 nm process is projected to be replaced by TSMC's 3 nm process as the latest technology. At launch it will be the most advanced fab in the United States. TSMC plans to spend $12 billion on the project over eight years, beginning in 2021. It will create 1,900 jobs directly.

The investment of US$9.4 billion to build its third 300mm wafer fabrication facility in Central Taiwan Science Park (Fab 15) was originally announced in 2010. The facility was expected to manufacture over 100,000 wafers a month and generate US$5 billion per year of revenue. TSMC has continued to expand advanced 28 nm manufacturing capacity at Fab 15.

On 12 January 2011, TSMC announced the acquisition of land from Powerchip Semiconductor for NT$2.9 billion (US$96 million) to build two additional 300mm fabs (Fab 12B) to cope with increasing global demand.

WaferTech subsidiary 

WaferTech, a subsidiary of TSMC, is a pure-play semiconductor foundry employing 1,100 workers, located in Camas, Washington, United States, the second-largest pure-play foundry in the United States. The largest is GlobalFoundries Fab 8 in Malta, New York, which employs over 3,000 workers with over  under one roof.

WaferTech was established in June 1996 as a joint venture with TSMC, Altera, Analog Devices, and ISSI as key partners. The four companies and minor individual investors placed US$1.2 billion into this venture, which was at the time the single largest startup investment in the state of Washington. The company started production in July 1998 in its 200mm semiconductor fabrication plant. Its first product was a 0.35 micrometer part for Altera.

TSMC bought out the joint venture partners in 2000 and acquired full control, operating it as a fully owned subsidiary.

WaferTech is based in Camas,  outside Portland, Oregon. The main fabrication facility consists of a  200mm wafer fabrication plant.

In 2015, Dr. Tsung Kuo was named company president and fab director of WaferTech.

See also 

 5 nanometer
 List of companies of Taiwan
 List of semiconductor fabrication plants
 Moore's law
 Pure-play semiconductor foundry
 Quantum tunnelling
 Semiconductor device fabrication
 Semiconductor industry in Taiwan
 United Microelectronics Corporation
 Very-large-scale integration

References

External links 

 
 

Electronics companies established in 1987
Taiwanese companies established in 1987
1993 initial public offerings
Manufacturing companies based in Hsinchu
Companies listed on the Taiwan Stock Exchange
Electronics companies of Taiwan
Semiconductor companies of Taiwan
Foundry semiconductor companies
Taiwanese brands
Technology companies of Taiwan
Companies listed on the New York Stock Exchange